Straza may refer to:

Bosnia and Herzegovina 
 Straža, Bosnia and Herzegovina

North Macedonia 
 Straža, Lipkovo

Poland 
 Straża

Serbia 
 Straža (Loznica), a village in Mačva District
 Straža (Vršac), a village in South Banat District

Slovakia 
 Stráža

Slovenia 
 Municipality of Straža, in southeastern Slovenia
 Straža, Cerkno, a settlement in the Municipality of Cerkno
 Straža, Lukovica, a settlement in the Municipality of Lukovica
 Straža pri Dolu, a settlement in the Municipality of Vojnik
 Straža na Gori, a settlement in the Municipality of Šentjur
 Straža pri Krškem, a settlement in the Municipality of Krško
 Straža pri Moravčah, a settlement in the Municipality of Moravče
 Straža pri Novi Cerkvi, a settlement in the Municipality of Vojnik
 Straža pri Oplotnici, a settlement in the Municipality of Oplotnica
 Straža pri Raki, a settlement in the Municipality of Krško
 Straža, Šentrupert, a settlement in the Municipality of Šentrupert
 Straža, Straža, a settlement in the Municipality of Straža

See also 
 Stróża (disambiguation)
 Strazha (disambiguation)
 Straja (disambiguation)